Peter Saville may refer to:
Peter Saville (graphic designer) (born 1955), English art director and graphic designer
Peter Saville (psychologist) (born 1946), British psychologist
Peter Savill, former chairman of the British Horse Racing Board